Lothair is a village located  northeast of Ermelo and  southeast of Chrissiesmeer, in the Msukaligwa Local Municipality in the Mpumalanga province of South Africa. Situated on the Bonny Brook in an area settled by Scottish immigrants, it was surveyed in 1878 and named after Lothair, the novel written by Benjamin Disraeli and published in 1870.

Lothair is at the end of a railway line from Ermelo; the Swazilink project aims to connect this line to the Eswatini Railways network at Sidvokodvo in Eswatini.

It houses a small community that depends on working on the farms for a living.

References

Populated places in the Msukaligwa Local Municipality